The ZF 4HP18 is a four-speed automatic transmission for passenger cars from ZF Friedrichshafen AG.  Introduced in 1987, and produced through 1998, it was used in a variety of cars from Alfa Romeo, Audi, Citroën, Dodge, Eagle, Fiat, Lancia, and Saab.

Specifications

Technical data

Applications

4HP18FL
front wheel drive longitudinal engine
1988–1992 Renault 25 V6 2.8
1988–1992 Eagle Premier/Dodge Monaco V6 3.0

4HP18FLA (Audi Quattro 4x4)
Audi version: longitudinal engine, quattro four-wheel drive
1992–1994 Audi S4 (C4) 5-cyl 2.2 Turbo
1992–1994 Audi 100 (C4) CS 2.8 V6
1995–1997 Audi A6 (C4) quattro 2.8 V6
1995–1997 Audi S6 (C4) quattro 5-cyl 2.2 Turbo

4HP18FLE (Audi FWD) 
longitudinal engine (non-quattro)
1991–1994 Porsche 968 4-cyl 3.0
1992–1993 Audi 100 2.8 V6
1992–1994 Audi 100 CS 2.8 V6
1992–1994 Audi 100 S 2.8 V6
1995–1997 Audi A6 2.8 V6
1995–1997 Audi A6 2.5 TDI (AEL) (AAT)

4HP18Q
front wheel drive transverse engine
1987–1989 Fiat 2000 2.0
1987–1989 Fiat 2500 2.5
1987–1998 Saab 9000
1989–1993 Alfa Romeo 164 V6 3.0
1989–1998 Citroën XM 2.0
1989–1998 Citroën XM V6 3.0
1989–1994 Fiat Croma 2.0
1989–1994 Lancia Thema 2.0
1989–1992 Lancia Thema V6 3.0
1989–1999 Peugeot 605 2.0
1989–1999 Peugeot 605 V6 3.0

4HP18QE
front wheel drive transverse engine
1993–1997 Alfa Romeo 164 V6 3.0
1993–1994 Lancia Thema V6 3.0

4HP18EH
front wheel drive transverse engine
1994–1998 Lancia Kappa V6 3.0

See also
list of ZF transmissions

References

4HP18